The White Shroud was a Sunni Syrian resistance movement established in 2014 to fight the occupation of the Islamic State of Iraq and the Levant in Deir ez-Zor Governorate. It claimed responsibility for assassinations of ISIL militants and commanders, and built a presence in the area of Deir ez-Zor. The organisation lost many of its fighters in an ISIL assault on Abu Kamal in April 2014.

See also
List of armed groups in the Syrian Civil War

References

Anti-government factions of the Syrian civil war
Sunni Islamist groups